Arcangelo Sannicandro (born 9 July 1943) is an Italian politician from the Left Ecology Freedom. As of 2014 he serves as member of the Chamber of Deputies representing Apulia.

References

1943 births
Living people
People from Bari
20th-century Italian lawyers
Article One (political party) politicians
Left Ecology Freedom politicians
Communist Refoundation Party politicians
21st-century Italian politicians
Members of the Chamber of Deputies (Italy)